Shiulimala (a garland of shiuli) (1931) is a book of short stories, written by Kazi Nazrul Islam. This book contains  four stories. The stories contained in the volume are: Padmagokhra, Shiulimala, Ognigiri, Jiner Badsha. These stories are erotic. Here we find romantic Nazrul. However, Nazrul made great contributions in Bengali.

References

.

Bengali-language literature
1931 short story collections
Erotic short stories
Kazi Nazrul Islam